Grabeel is a surname. Notable people with the surname include:

 Gene Grabeel (1920–2015), American mathematician and cryptanalyst
 Lucas Grabeel (born 1984), American actor

See also
 Grabel (surname)